Kahr Arms is an American small arms manufacturer specializing in compact and mid-size semi-automatic pistols chambered for popular cartridges, including .380 ACP, 9mm Luger, .40 S&W and .45 ACP. Kahr pistols feature polymer or stainless steel frames, single-stack magazines, and double-action-only striker firing actions. Kahr Arms is part of the Kahr Firearms Group, a US-based firearms manufacturer, which also includes Thompson Auto-Ordnance and Magnum Research. The Kahr Firearms Group company headquarters is in Greeley, Pennsylvania, with a manufacturing facility in Worcester, Massachusetts.

Kahr Arms was founded by Justin Moon, who is CEO and president. He is the son of Sun Myung Moon, founder of the Unification Church and brother to Hyung Jin Moon, pastor of the World Peace and Unification Sanctuary Church, which is known to hold blessing ceremonies for AR-15 rifles.

History
From the age of 14, Justin Moon enjoyed shooting guns. At age 18, Moon got a license to carry a handgun, co-signed by one of his older brothers, but he was not satisfied with the small calibers available in compact handguns. "I had been licensed to carry in New York State since I was 18 and had looked for an ultra-compact 9mm pistol," Justin later told American Handgunner. "To my chagrin, I could not find a pistol with the quality of construction and features in design which I felt were appropriate for a carry gun. Therefore, I decided to design an ultra-compact 9-mm pistol that I could carry." By his junior year of college, he decided to design one himself.

In 1999, Kahr Arms bought Auto-Ordnance Company, not associated with the original AOC, maker of Thompson submachine guns, then owned and operated by Numrich Arms who had bought the crated assets of Auto-Ordnance started by General John T. Thompson and his investors.  Now Kahr manufactures Auto-Ordnance's line of semi-automatic weapons, including a long-barreled rifle version of the famous "Tommy Gun".

Kahr offers its line of compact pistols at a time of significant liberalization of concealed weapons laws in many U.S. states.  Since the 1990s, many states have passed "shall-issue" laws, as promoted by the American National Rifle Association and other gun rights organizations.  Such laws mandate that state authorities must issue permits to carry concealed weapons to all law-abiding applicants who met certain conditions set forth by state law, including passing a comprehensive background check.

In 1994, the U.S. government banned manufacture and importation of pistol magazines with more than a 10-round capacity.  These were the so-called "high-capacity" magazines, which again became legal to manufacture and import in most states in September 2004, after the relevant federal law expired. This change in federal law rendered many staggered-magazine pistol models (commonly with magazine capacities of 15 or more rounds) less popular in the American market. They were now overly large in light of their newly mandated 10-shot limit. Kahr was at the forefront, offering relatively small, well-made pistols with magazine capacities of up to eight rounds of 9mm or .40-caliber ammunition. These single-stack magazines allow for slender, compact pistols that have proven popular with the buying public.

Since late 2003 or very early in 2004, Kahr has changed from offering a Limited Lifetime Warranty on their pistols to one of only five years' duration. In 2003 the New York Daily News reported that the Kahr K9 was popular as a back-up weapon with New York City police officers, who called it the "Moonie gun".

In June 2010, Kahr bought Magnum Research, which markets the Desert Eagle.

During the Shot Show in January 2015, the Kahr Arms company changed its name to the Kahr Firearms Group. Kahr Arms is currently under the Kahr Firearms Group as a private firearms manufacturer, alongside Magnum Research and Auto-Ordnance. The company's trademarks include: Kahr Arms, Thompson, Auto-Ordnance, Magnum Research, BFR, and Desert Eagle.

In September 2019, Kahr Firearms Group donated eight Thin Blue Line PM9's to the NRA Law Enforcement Division, two of which were used as special Firearm Awards at the National Police Shooting Championships.

New location
On July 1, 2013, the Kahr Arms company announced that it was leaving New York state because of New York's Secure Ammunition and Firearms Enforcement Act (NY SAFE Act) of 2013. Kahr purchased  in Pike County, Pennsylvania, and said it will move its corporate staff after building offices in 2014 with plans to build a new factory by 2019. The firearms group ceremoniously cut the ribbon at the grand opening of their new  headquarters on August 11, 2015, in Blooming Grove Township, Pike County, Pennsylvania.

Beginning September 17, 2018, all Kahr Firearms Group repairs and product returns must be sent prepaid via UPS Air or FedEx Overnight to the company's new location with a mailing address of Greeley, Pennsylvania, instead of to the old service/repair address of Worcester, Massachusetts. An RMA number is required for all returns or repairs.

Kahr design

The Kahr action is a Browning locked-breech design featuring a striker-operated firing pin with a passive firing pin safety, making it a true hammerless action. When the trigger is pulled, the trigger bar begins to rotate a double-lobed cocking cam.  This cam simultaneously begins to draw the striker to the rear, compressing the spring behind it, while depressing and deactivating the firing pin block.  At the end of the trigger's travel, the lobe contacting the striker slips off the striker and releases it; the other lobe has, by this point, completely depressed the firing pin block and permitted the striker to snap forward and strike the primer.  This single piece takes the place of more complicated and fragile designs employed in other pistols.  It is similar in principle, though very different in execution, to the action design of Glocks.  It also allows the firing pin block to be located further to the rear of the slide and therefore further from possible contamination by combustion gases and powder fouling.  For this innovation, Justin Moon was awarded one of the five patents he owns on the Kahr pistol design.  This system is employed on all Kahr pistols, regardless of frame material, size, or caliber.

Kahr's trigger is similar to a double-action revolver, with a short  trigger travel. On polymer-framed models, the slide travels on steel inserts that are permanently set into the polymer frame. There are also polymer rails, which are not structurally functional, but aid in keeping out dirt, and with aligning the slide when reassembling the slide onto the polymer frame. In steel framed versions, the rail design is traditional and very similar to that of the M1911 pistol. Kahr pistols have their feed ramps offset to the left, which allows the trigger draw bar to lie flatter against the right side of the frame.

The initial Kahr offering, the K9, provided a full-power 9mm Parabellum pistol that was virtually the same size, and in some dimensions, smaller, as widely accepted "Pocket Pistol" .380 ACP and .32 ACP handguns such as the Walther PP and PPK/S, as well as the SIG Sauer P230/232, and the Beretta "80" Series.

Kahr offers a line of "economy" pistols which are identical to the P series of pistols except that some luxury features are eliminated to cut costs. The polymer-frame CW economy models have fewer machining operations, pinned-in front sights rather than dovetail, traditional rifling rather than polygonal rifling, "rolled-on" lettering rather than engraved, and come with only one magazine. CW pistols generally retail for approximately 20–30% less than the full-featured P series. The E series is a discontinued line of Kahr economy pistols with stainless frame; the E series was discontinued in 2004.

Pistols
Kahr currently manufactures and distributes the following semi-automatic pistols:

References

External links
 Kahr Homepage

Firearm manufacturers of the United States
Companies based in Pike County, Pennsylvania
American companies established in 1995
Firearms manufacturers in Pennsylvania
1995 establishments in New York (state)
Manufacturing companies established in 1995
Privately held companies based in Pennsylvania